CFXW-FM (96.7 MHz, Boom 96.7) is a radio station in Whitecourt, Alberta, Canada, and is transmitted on 96.7 FM in Whitecourt and on 98.1 FM in Fox Creek. Owned by Stingray Group, it broadcasts a classic hits format.

History
The station was originally on the AM dial as CFYR, until it received CRTC approval to move to 96.7 FM in 1996, then launched as CFYR-FM.

In 2005, CFYR received CRTC approval to operate a transmitter at Whitecourt on the frequency 96.7 FM to replace CFYR-FM and launch as a stand-alone station with the callsign CFXW-FM.

On October 7, 2013, Newcap submitted an application to add a new FM transmitter at Fox Creek (CFXW-FM-1) to rebroadcast CFXW-FM at 98.1 MHz with 610 watts. This rebroadcaster was approved on January 23, 2014. The 98.1 transmitter is still used as a repeater for CFXW today.

On July 7, 2017, the station flipped from active rock (as 96.7 The Rig) to classic hits, branded as Boom 96.7.

References

External links
 
 
 

Fxw
Fxw
Fxw
Whitecourt
Radio stations established in 1974
1974 establishments in Alberta